Intereuodynerus is a genus of potter wasps with two species (Intereuodynerus siegberti and Intereuodynerus fritzi) known from Syria, and a third one (Intereuodynerus siamesicus) from Thailand.

References

 Gusenleitner, J. 1997. Die Gattungen Syneuodynerus Blüthgen 1951 und Intereuodynerus gen. nov. im Nahen Osten (Hymenoptera, Eumenidae). Linzer Biologische Beiträge 29 (2) : 763–769. 

Biological pest control wasps
Potter wasps
Hymenoptera genera